Camandona is a comune (municipality) in the Province of Biella in the Italian region Piedmont, located about  northeast of Turin and about  northeast of Biella.

Camandona borders the following municipalities: Bioglio, Callabiana, Pettinengo, Piatto, Trivero, Vallanzengo, Valle San Nicolao, Veglio.

Demographic evolution

Twin towns — sister cities
Camandona is twinned with:

  Faucigny, France (2011)

Photo gallery

References

Cities and towns in Piedmont